Osmium oxide may refer to:

Osmium dioxide, OsO2
Osmium tetroxide, OsO4